Coco is the debut studio album by American singer-songwriter Colbie Caillat. The album was released on July 17, 2007 in the United States, debuting at number five on the US Billboard 200, selling 51,000 copies in its first week. It also became Caillat's best-selling album to date, selling 2,100,000 copies in the United States and over 3,000,000 copies around the world. Caillat supported the album with the Coco World Tour, as well as four singles. The lead single "Bubbly" was a huge international hit, while the following two singles "Realize" and "The Little Things" were minor hits. "Somethin' Special" was released as a promo support the 2008 Summer Olympics in Beijing, China and the 2009 film Bride Wars.

Background and recording
Caillat met producer Mikal Blue, who hired her to sing on techno songs used at fashion shows. Caillat began playing the acoustic guitar at the age of 19 and Blue helped her record her first song. She auditioned for American Idol but was rejected at the pre-audition stage and was unable to sing for the judges. The second time she auditioned for the show, she sang her own original song "Bubbly" and was rejected once again. However, Caillat expressed gratitude at the judges' decision, saying "I was shy. I was nervous. I didn't look the greatest. I wasn't ready for it yet. I was glad, when I auditioned, that they said no." The popularity of Caillat's MySpace profile led her to become the number-one unsigned singer in her genre for four consecutive months. Her father also produced her demo songs, and was involved in production of later albums. Coco was produced by Mikal Blue, with additional production by Caillat, her father Ken Caillat and Jason Reeves.

Title and artwork
The album was titled "Coco" because Coco was Caillat's nickname given to her when she was a young child. The album's artwork was a still from Caillat's music video for the album's lead single "Bubbly", released on May 15, 2007. There are differences between the artwork for the standard and deluxe editions. The standard artwork shows the photo with a brown frame, while the deluxe artwork shows the photo without the frame but with blue waves and the words "DELUXE EDITION" on top. Also, a little yellow flower drawn next to the album title wasn't shown on the deluxe artwork.

Release and promotion
Coco was released on July 10, 2007 in Australia and Asia and a week later in North America. Its deluxe edition was released on September 3, 2008 in Japan and November 11, 2008 worldwide. The album was certified 2× Platinum by the RIAA with shipments to U.S. retailers of 2,000,000 units. The album's first single, a smash hit, was "Bubbly", followed by a second single, "Realize", and the third, "The Little Things", which became the final single from the album in the United States. The deluxe edition song, "Somethin' Special (Beijing Olympic Mix)", was released as a fourth single on July 29, to give support to the American athletes participating in the 2008 Summer Olympics in Beijing, China. The song also appeared on the AT&T Team USA Soundtrack.

According to one of the pictures on Caillat's MySpace page, it was assumed that her song "Battle" would have been the fourth and final single from Coco. Because of her collaboration with Jason Mraz, "Lucky", being released as a single and with the release of her second album, it is assumed that the single and music video were canceled and all promotion was then focused on "Lucky" and her second album Breakthrough.

Coco was also promoted with two tours: Coco Summer Tour in 2007 and Coco World Tour in 2008.

Singles
"Bubbly" was released as the lead single from the album on May 15, 2007 in United States. It remains Caillat's biggest hit in the US to date, and her only single to reach the top ten of the Billboard Hot 100. The single's music video, directed by Liz Friedlander, aired on MTV, VH1 and CMT. A still from the music video was used as the cover for the album. The video/single was also featured in the hit PlayStation 2 karaoke game SingStar Pop Vol 2 released in late September 2008 in the United States. It was also featured in SingStar Hottest Hits in PAL regions.
"Realize" was officially released in January 2008 as the second single from the album, peaking at number 20 on the Billboard Hot 100 chart, becoming her second Top 20 hit in the U.S. The song is musically similar to "Bubbly", as it is an acoustic folk-pop song, where Caillat sings of having feelings for a best friend. Caillat and her backup band performed "Realize" as the featured musical performance that closed the May 23, 2008 broadcast of The Tonight Show with Jay Leno
"The Little Things" was released as the third single in Germany on March 7, 2008 and in United States in October 2008. The single did not chart well in the US, and was her weakest charting single from the album, peaking at number seven on US Billboard Bubbling Under Hot 100. In 2008, she recorded a French translated version of this song.

Promotional singles
"Tailor Made" was released as first promotional single in 2007. "Midnight Bottle" was released as promotional single on January 2008 only in Brazil as soundtrack song of Brazilian telenovela The Three Sisters. The song peaked at number one in Brazil. "Somethin' Special" was released as the third promotional on July 29, 2008 to support to the American athletes participating in the 2008 Summer Olympics in Beijing, China. The song also was also the opening song of the 2009 film Bride Wars.

Critical reception

Critical reviews of the album were mixed.  AllMusic said "she sings about simple, everyday things in an unassuming manner, letting her melodies and girl-next-door charm carry the day". Chuck Arnold (of People magazine) said that "although the midtempo tracks start to blend together, this California girl keeps the sun-kissed sounds coming." Caryn Ganz (with Rolling Stone) said Caillat has "soulful swing, but over a dozen bland, sunny tunes, it's hard to pin her down."

Track listing

Charts

Weekly charts

Year-end charts

Certifications

Release history

References

External links
Official website

2007 debut albums
Albums produced by Ken Caillat
Colbie Caillat albums
Universal Republic Records albums
Albums produced by Mikal Blue